Close Your Eyes is an upcoming drama film directed by Víctor Erice.

Plot 
Around three decades after the mysterious disappearance near the sea of actor Julio Arenas while shooting a film in the 1990s, a TV show revives the case, coming to involve film director and close Arenas' friend Miguel Garay.

Cast

Production 
The project (marking Erice's first full-length picture since the 1992 docudrama The Quince Tree Sun) was revealed upon the disclosure of the allocation of public funding to film productions by Andalusian regional broadcaster Canal Sur in mid 2022. It is a Pecado Films, Tandem Films, Nautilus Films, Pampa Films and La voz del adiós AIE production, with the participation of RTVE, Canal Sur, EiTB, Movistar Plus+, and support of ICAA, and the Andalusia and Madrid regional administrations. The screenplay was penned by Erice along with Michel Gaztambide.

Shooting locations included Castell de Ferro and Gualchos (province of Granada) and Aguadulce (province of Almería), as well as Asturias and Madrid.

Release 
Distributed by Avalon in Spain, the film is tentatively intended for a 2023 release.  acquired distribution rights in France.

See also 
 List of Spanish films of 2023

References 

Films directed by Víctor Erice
Films shot in the province of Granada
Films shot in the province of Almería
Films shot in Asturias
Films shot in Madrid
Upcoming films
Films about film directors and producers
Films about actors
Films scored by Federico Jusid
Upcoming Spanish-language films